Novogalstovka is a rural locality (a settlement) in Staroaleysky Selsoviet, Tretyakovsky District, Altai Krai, Russia. The population was 129 as of 2013. There is 1 street.

Geography 
Novogalstovka is located 5 km southeast of Staroaleyskoye (the district's administrative centre) by road. Staroaleyskoye is the nearest rural locality.

References 

Rural localities in Tretyakovsky District